Andrew Dennis Wiedeman (born August 22, 1989) is a retired American soccer player, who played as a forward.

Career

College and amateur
Wiedeman played college soccer at the University of California, where he earned numerous individual honors, including NSCAA Far West All-Region and All-Pac-10 first teams in 2009 and NSCAA third-team All-American, All-Pac-10 first-team selection, Top Drawer Soccer's Team of the Season, NSCAA Far West All-Region first team and Pac-10 all-academic second-team selection in 2008. He left college early to enter the 2010 MLS SuperDraft as a Generation Adidas player.

During his college years Wiedeman also played with San Jose Frogs in the USL Premier Development League during the 2008 season and NorCal Lamorinda United in the National Premier Soccer League during the 2009 season. Wiedeman was also a four-year starter for the California High School Fighting Grizzlies, earning all-East Bay Athletic League Honors his Junior year. Wiedeman holds an Irish passport through descent.

Professional
Wiedeman was drafted in the second round (21st overall) of the 2010 MLS SuperDraft by FC Dallas. He made his professional debut on April 28, 2010 in US Open Cup game against D.C. United.

Wiedeman was traded to Toronto FC in exchange for Julian de Guzman on July 13, 2012.

In Toronto, he rejoined former FC Dallas teammate and fellow Californian Eric Avila. He made his debut for the club a day later coming on as a substitute for Danny Koevermans, who exited with an injury, in the 41st minute. Toronto FC went on to win that game 1–0 against the New England Revolution.

He scored his first professional goal in only his second appearance for Toronto FC on July 18, 2012, coming on as a substitute for Eric Avila in the 59th minute of a home game against the Colorado Rapids and scoring the game-winning goal in the 67th minute of play, off a deflected shot from teammate Luis Silva, to earn Toronto a 2–1 victory.

Wiedeman was signed by Ottawa Fury FC of the North American Soccer League on January 26, 2015. He would score his first and second goals for the club in a 4–1 win over Indy Eleven on August 8, 2015.

On December 7, 2015 Wiedeman was announced as one of the first 11 signings for USL expansion club FC Cincinnati.

Following the end of the 2017 season at FC Cincinnati, Wiedeman retired from professional soccer to pursue a bachelor's degree at the University of California, Berkeley.

References

External links

 
 
 

1989 births
Living people
American soccer players
American expatriate soccer players
California Golden Bears men's soccer players
San Jose Frogs players
FC Dallas players
Toronto FC players
Ottawa Fury FC players
Association football forwards
Expatriate soccer players in Canada
USL League Two players
Major League Soccer players
North American Soccer League players
United States men's youth international soccer players
FC Dallas draft picks
Soccer players from California
FC Cincinnati (2016–18) players
People from San Ramon, California
American people of Irish descent